Jan Raas (born 8 November 1952) is a Dutch former professional cyclist whose 115 wins include the 1979 World Road Race Championship in Valkenburg, he also won the Tour of Flanders in 1979 and 1983, Paris–Roubaix in 1982 and Milan–San Remo in 1977. He won ten stages in the Tour de France.  In six starts, Raas won the Amstel Gold Race five times. In his entire career he competed in 23 of the highly contested "Monument" Races and he finished on the podium in almost half of them: 1st place four times and 3rd place six times.

Raas was a tactician and clever sprinter. He struggled on the long steep climbs but excelled on the short climbs characteristic of the northern classics.

Career
Born in Heinkenszand, near Goes in Zeeland, Raas was the son of a farmer and one of 10 children. He showed no interest in cycling until leaving school at 16 when he acquired his first racing bike and started competing as a junior category, taking his first victory in Damme in Belgium on the 21 July 1969.

The 22-year-old had a good first season with two small victories and fourth in the Tour of Belgium.

In 1977 he rode for Frisol. Raas became the influence behind the success of the team in the late seventies and early eighties. He was joint leader with Gerrie Knetemann, heading members such as Joop Zoetemelk, Ludo Peeters, Cees Priem and Henk Lubberding.

He played a major role in the victory of Zoetemelk in the 1980 Tour de France, as TI-Raleigh had one of the most dominant performances in all of TDF history not only containing Bernard Hinault, but also winning twelve stages, including seven in a row at one point.

Raas’ highlights for the rest of his career included his 1979 world championship on home soil in Valkenburg, where he outsprinted German "Didi" Thurau in front of 200,000 spectators (even with the help from team-mates that push him during the climb, grabbing service vehicle, and the fall of Giovanni Battaglin caused by Thurau and Raas himself on the last 200m). He had four more victories in the Amstel Gold Race to give a record of five. Raas regarded the Amstel Gold as his favourite race: “The Gold Race was made for me, I had no ability as a climber, but the short and hard Limburg hills were made for me”, he said. He won Paris–Roubaix at his seventh attempt in 1982 thanks to work by his team, especially Peeters.

Raas crashed in the 1984 Milan–San Remo, injuring his back and internal organs and was never the same, although he took a stage in the 1984 Tour de France. He found the training and recovery hard and retired on 28 May 1985 after a criterium at Hansweert the preceding day.

Raas’ know-how made for a natural move into team management and he became sporting director of Kwantum team. Raas found sponsors when old ones pulled out and the team received backing from SuperConfex, Buckler, WordPerfect, Novell and finally Rabobank.

Raas and his wife Anja suffered an armed raid on their house in March 1994 and Raas decided he could no longer spend long periods away from home. He changed from sporting director to manager when Rabobank became the main sponsor in 1995. He spent eight years in this capacity until the end of 2003, the sponsor indicating that insoluble differences prompted Raas' departure.

Major results 

Source:

1972
 1st Stage 5 Olympia's Tour
1973
 1st Ronde van Midden-Nederland
1974
 Olympia's Tour
1st Stages 7a & 8
 2nd Ronde van Drenthe
1975
 1st Grote Prijs Stad Zottegem
 5th Paris–Tours
 6th E3 Prijs Vlaanderen
 6th Tour of Flanders
 8th Omloop Het Volk
1976
 1st  Road race, National Road Championships
 1st Stage 4 Tour of Belgium
 2nd Amstel Gold Race
 2nd Tour du Haut Var
 4th Brabantse Pijl
 7th Paris–Roubaix
 9th Omloop Het Volk
1977
 1st Milan–San Remo
 1st Amstel Gold Race
 1st Stage 6 Tour de France
 2nd Omloop Het Volk
 3rd Tour of Flanders
 4th Overall Tour Méditerranéen
1st Stage 1
 5th Brabantse Pijl
 6th Paris–Roubaix
 7th E3 Prijs Vlaanderen
 8th Paris–Tours
 10th Gent–Wevelgem
1978
 1st Amstel Gold Race
 1st Paris–Brussels
 1st Paris–Tours
 Tour de France
1st Prologue, Stages 1a & 21
 1st Stage 2 Ronde van Nederland
 1st Stage 3 Tour de Suisse
 1st Stage 4 Four Days of Dunkirk
 2nd E3 Prijs Vlaanderen
 3rd Paris–Roubaix
 3rd Omloop Het Volk
 4th Gent–Wevelgem
1979
 1st  Road race, UCI Road World Championships
 1st  Overall Ronde van Nederland
1st Prologue
1st Stage 2
 1st Amstel Gold Race
 1st E3 Prijs Vlaanderen
 1st Tour of Flanders
 1st Stage 5 Tour de France
 1st Stage 3 Paris–Nice
 1st Stage 4 Deutschland Tour
 1st Stage 1b Tour of Belgium
 Tour Méditerranéen
1st Prologue & Stage 5a
 2nd Omloop Het Volk
 3rd Gent–Wevelgem
 3rd Paris–Tours
 5th Paris–Roubaix
1980
 Tour de France
1st Stages 1a, 1b (TTT), 7b & 9
 1st Amstel Gold Race
 1st E3 Prijs Vlaanderen
 1st Kuurne–Brussels–Kuurne
 1st Stage 1b Paris–Nice
 1st Stage 3 Ronde van Nederland
 1st Stage 3 Tour of Belgium
 Tour Méditerranéen
1st Prologue (with Gerrie Knetemann), Stages 2 & 3b
 1st Stage 3 Étoile de Bessèges
 Tour de Luxembourg
1st Prologue & Stage 1
 1st Stage GP de Cannes
 1st Six Days of Rotterdam (track) (with René Pijnen)
 3rd Milan–San Remo
 3rd Tour of Flanders
 3rd Scheldeprijs Vlaanderen
 4th Omloop Het Volk
 6th Gent–Wevelgem
1981
 1st  Overall Étoile de Bessèges
1st Prologue, Stages 1 & 3
 1st E3 Prijs Vlaanderen
 1st Gent–Wevelgem
 1st Omloop Het Volk
 1st Grote Prijs Jef Scherens
 1st Stage 3b Tour Méditerranéen
 3rd Tour of Flanders
 5th Amstel Gold Race
1982
 1st Amstel Gold Race
 1st Paris–Roubaix
 1st Dwars door België
 2nd Overall Ronde van Nederland
1st Prologue
 1st Prologue Étoile de Bessèges
 Tour de France
1st Stages 6 & 9a (TTT)
 5th E3 Prijs Vlaanderen
 6th Omloop Het Volk
1983
 1st  Road race, National Road Championships
 1st Tour of Flanders
 1st Kuurne–Brussels–Kuurne
 1st Ronde van Midden-Zeeland
 1st Stage 1a Three Days of De Panne
 2nd Gent–Wevelgem
 2nd Omloop Het Volk
 3rd Milan–San Remo
 3rd Amstel Gold Race
1984
 1st  Road race, National Road Championships
 1st Stage 9 Tour de France

General classification results timeline 
Source:

Classics results timeline
Source:

Major championship results timeline
Source:

Awards
 Dutch Sportsman of the year: 1979

See also
 List of Dutch cyclists who have led the Tour de France general classification

References

External links 

 

1952 births
Living people
Dutch male cyclists
Dutch Tour de France stage winners
Tour de France prologue winners
UCI Road World Champions (elite men)
Tour de Suisse stage winners
UCI Road World Championships cyclists for the Netherlands
Sportspeople from Borsele
Cyclists from Zeeland